Haymarket Theatre refers to several theatres, including:
Theatre Royal, Haymarket in London
Haymarket Theatre (Boston, Massachusetts)
Haymarket Theatre (Leicester)
Haymarket Theatre, Melbourne (1862–1871)